Bennett Lester Carter (August 8, 1907 – July 12, 2003) was an American jazz saxophonist, clarinetist, trumpeter, composer, arranger, and bandleader. With Johnny Hodges, he was a pioneer on the alto saxophone. From the beginning of his career in the 1920s, he worked as an arranger including written charts for Fletcher Henderson's big band that shaped the swing style. He had an unusually long career that lasted into the 1990s. During the 1980s and 1990s, he was nominated for eight Grammy Awards, which included receiving a Lifetime Achievement Award.

Career
Carter was born in New York City in 1907. He was given piano lessons by his mother and others in the neighborhood. He played trumpet and experimented briefly with C-melody saxophone before settling on alto saxophone. In the 1920s, he performed with June Clark, Billy Paige, and Earl Hines, then toured as a member of the Wilberforce Collegians led by Horace Henderson.
He appeared on record for the first time in 1927 as a member of the Paradise Ten led by Charlie Johnson. He returned to the Collegians and became their bandleader through 1929, including a performance at the Savoy Ballroom in New York City.

In his early 1920s, Carter worked as arranger for Fletcher Henderson after that position was vacated by Don Redman. He had no formal education in arranging, learning by trial and error, getting on his knees and looking at the existing charts, "writing the lead trumpet first and the lead saxophone first—which, of course, is the hard way. It was quite some time that I did that before I knew what a score was."

He left Henderson to take Redman's former job as leader of McKinney's Cotton Pickers in Detroit. In 1932, he formed a band in New York City that included Chu Berry, Sid Catlett, Cozy Cole, Bill Coleman, Ben Webster, Dicky Wells, and Teddy Wilson. Carter's arrangements were complex. Among the most significant were "Keep a Song in Your Soul", written for Henderson in 1930, and "Lonesome Nights" and "Symphony in Riffs" from 1933, both of which show Carter's writing for saxophones.

By the early 1930s, Carter and Johnny Hodges were considered the leading alto saxophonists. Carter also became a leading trumpet soloist, having rediscovered the instrument. He recorded extensively on trumpet in the 1930s. Carter's short-lived Orchestra played the Harlem Club in New York but only recorded a handful of records for Columbia, OKeh and Vocalion. The OKeh sides were issued under the name The Chocolate Dandies.

In 1933, Carter participated in sessions with British composer/musician Spike Hughes, who visited New York City to organize recordings with prominent African American musicians. These 14 sides plus four by Carter's big band, titled at the time Spike Hughes and His Negro Orchestra, were initially only issued in England. The musicians were from Carter's band and included Red Allen, Dicky Wells, Wayman Carver, Coleman Hawkins, J. C. Higginbotham, and Chu Berry.

Carter moved to London and spent two years as arranger for the BBC Big Band. In England, France, and Scandinavia he recorded with local musicians, and he took his band to the Netherlands. In these settings, Carter played trumpet, clarinet, piano, alto and tenor saxophone, and provided occasional vocals. In 1938, he returned to America. He found regular work leading his band at the Savoy Ballroom in Harlem through 1941. The band included Shad Collins, Sidney De Paris, Vic Dickenson, and Freddie Webster. After this engagement, he led a seven-piece band which included Eddie Barefield, Kenny Clarke, and Dizzy Gillespie.

In the midd-1940s, he moved to Los Angeles, forming another big band, which at times included J. J. Johnson, Max Roach, and Miles Davis. But these would be his last big bands. With the exception of occasional concerts, performing with Jazz at the Philharmonic, and recording, he ceased working as a touring big band bandleader. Los Angeles provided him many opportunities for studio work, and these dominated his time during the decades. He wrote music and arrangements for films, such as Stormy Weather in 1943. During the 1950s and '60s, he wrote arrangements for vocalists such as Louis Armstrong, Ray Charles, Ella Fitzgerald, Peggy Lee, and Sarah Vaughan. On something of a comeback in the 1970s, Carter returned to playing saxophone again and toured the Middle East courtesy of the U.S. State Department. He began making annual visits to Europe and Japan.

In 1969, Carter was persuaded to spend a weekend at Princeton University by Morroe Berger, a sociology professor at Princeton who wrote about jazz. This led to a new outlet for Carter's talent: teaching. For the next nine years he visited Princeton five times, most of them brief stays except for one in 1973 when he spent a semester there as a visiting professor. In 1974, Princeton gave him an honorary doctorate. He conducted teaching at workshops and seminars at several other universities and was a visiting lecturer at Harvard for a week in 1987. Morroe Berger wrote Benny Carter – A Life in American Music (1982), a two-volume work about Carter's career.

Time had little effect on Carter's abilities. During the 1980s, he wrote the long composition Central City Sketches which was performed at Cooper Union by the American Jazz Orchestra. Another long composition, Glasgow Suite, was performed in Scotland. Lincoln Center commissioned him to write "Good Vibes" in 1990. The National Endowment for the Arts gave him a grant that led Tales of the Rising Sun Suite and Harlem Renaissance Suite. This music was performed in 1992 when he was 85 years old.

Carter had an unusually long career. He is one of few musicians to have recorded in eight different decades. Another characteristic of his career was its versatility as musician, bandleader, arranger, and composer. He helped define the sound of alto saxophone, but he also performed and recorded on soprano saxophone, tenor saxophone, trumpet, trombone, clarinet, and piano. He helped establish a foundation for arranging as far back as 1930 when he arranged "Keep a Song in Your Soul" for Fletcher Henderson's big band. His compositions include the novelty hit "Cow-Cow Boogie" recorded by Ella Mae Morse, and the expansive Central City Sketches, written when he was 80 years old and recorded with the American Jazz Orchestra.

Death
Carter died at the age of 95 in Los Angeles at Cedars-Sinai Medical Center on July 12, 2003 from complications of bronchitis.

Awards and honors
He was inducted into the DownBeat Jazz Hall of Fame in 1977. In 1978, he was inducted into the Black Filmmakers Hall of Fame. In 1980, he received the Golden Score award of the American Society of Music Arrangers and Composers. His 75th birthday was commemorated by a radio station in New York that played his music nonstop for over a week.  The National Endowment for the Arts gave him the NEA Jazz Masters Award for 1986.

He was given a Grammy Lifetime Achievement Award in 1987. In 1994 he won a Grammy Award for his solo on "Prelude to a Kiss" and received a star on the Hollywood Walk of Fame.

In 1989, Lincoln Center celebrated Carter's 82nd birthday with a set of his songs sung by Ernestine Anderson and Sylvia Syms. In 1990, he was named Jazz Artist of the Year in the DownBeat and JazzTimes polls. He was a Kennedy Center Honoree in 1996 and received honorary doctorates from Princeton (1974), Rutgers (1991), Harvard (1994), and the New England Conservatory of Music (1998). In 2016, the National Museum of American History made Carter the subject of its Jazz Appreciation Month poster.

In 2000, he was given the National Medal of Arts by President Bill Clinton.

Grammy Awards
 Wins: 3
 Nominations: 9

Discography
Information from AllMusic.com

As arranger

As sideman
With Louis Bellson
 Skin Deep (Norgran, 1953) 
With Dizzy Gillespie
 The Complete RCA Victor Recordings (Bluebird, 1937–1949, [1995])
With Jazz at the Philharmonic
 The Drum Battle (Verve, 1952 [1960])
With Peggy Lee
Blues Cross Country (Capitol, 1962) -- also some arrangements
With Dave Pell
I Remember John Kirby (Capitol, 1961)
With Nancy Wilson
The Sound of Nancy Wilson (Capitol, 1968)
Nancy (Capitol, 1969)

Songs composed by Carter
 "Blues in My Heart" (1931) with Irving Mills
 "When Lights Are Low" (1936) with Spencer Williams
 "Cow-Cow Boogie (Cuma-Ti-Yi-Yi-Ay)"  (1942) with Don Raye and Gene De Paul
 "Key Largo" (1948) with Karl Suessdorf, Leah Worth
 "Rock Me to Sleep" (1950) with Paul Vandervoort II
 "A Kiss from You" (1964) with Johnny Mercer
 "Only Trust Your Heart" (1964) with Sammy Cahn

Film and video
 Thousands Cheer (1943)
 An American in Paris (1951)
 Clash by Night (1952)
 The Snows of Kilimanjaro (1952)
 Buck and the Preacher (1972)
 Jazz at the Smithsonian: Benny Carter (1982)
 Benny Carter in Japan (1986)
 Wolf Trap Salutes Dizzy Gillespie (1988)
 Benny Carter: Symphony in Riffs (1989)

See also
 List of jazz arrangers

References

External links

 Benny's Music Class, Audio clips at the National Museum of American History web site
 Biography on swingmusic.net
 Benny Carter's entry in Jazz Improv magazine
 Benny Carter Audio Collection, Institute of Jazz Studies, Dana Library, Rutgers University, Newark, New Jersey
 Benny Carter Interview NAMM Oral History Library (1994)
 Benny Carter interview, Smithsonian Jazz Oral History Program at the National Museum of American History
 Benny Carter recordings at the Discography of American Historical Recordings.

1907 births
2003 deaths
20th-century American saxophonists
20th-century trumpeters
American clarinetists
American jazz alto saxophonists
American male saxophonists
American music arrangers
Big band bandleaders
Jazz alto saxophonists
Jazz arrangers
Mainstream jazz clarinetists
Mainstream jazz saxophonists
Mainstream jazz trumpeters
Swing bandleaders
Swing clarinetists
Swing saxophonists
Swing trumpeters
Kennedy Center honorees
United States National Medal of Arts recipients
Grammy Lifetime Achievement Award winners
American male jazz musicians
McKinney's Cotton Pickers members
The Chocolate Dandies members
Black & Blue Records artists
20th-century American male musicians
Vocalion Records artists
Capitol Records artists
BBC Big Band members